Randolph L. Speight (31 August 1919 – 19 February 1999) was an American jurist and director of the Pioneer Fund.

He was a partner at Shearson Hamill. He also worked at Brown, Harris, Stevens. A resident of Smith's Parish, Bermuda after retirement, he died suddenly in Mexico.

External links
Pioneer Fund Founders and Former Directors
Paid Notice: Deaths SPEIGHT, RANDOLPH L.

1919 births
1999 deaths
20th-century American lawyers
Expatriates in Bermuda